Nissan Motors v. Nissan Computer was a lengthy court case between the two parties over use of the name Nissan and the domain name nissan.com. The case has received national attention in the U.S.

Background

Nissan Motor Company
Beginning in the late 1970s, Datsun began progressively fitting its cars with small "Nissan" and "Datsun by Nissan" badges. The company eventually changed its branding at 1,100 Datsun dealerships. In autumn 1981, Datsun announced that its name would be changed in the United States. Between 1982 and 1986, the company transitioned from its "Datsun, We Are Driven!" to its "The Name is Nissan" campaign. Five years after the name change program was over, cars in some export markets continued to display badges bearing both names and Datsun still remained more familiar than Nissan.

Uzi Nissan
In 1980, Uzi Nissan founded Nissan Foreign Car, an automobile service, in Raleigh, North Carolina. In 1987, Uzi Nissan founded Nissan International, Ltd, an import/export company that traded primarily in heavy equipment and computers. On 14 May 1991, Uzi Nissan founded Nissan Computer Corporation, which provides sales and service of personal computers, servers, and computer parts, as well as internet hosting and development. Nissan Computer registered nissan.com for its use on 4 June 1994, five years prior to Nissan Motor Corporation's interest in the domain.

In July 2020, Uzi Nissan died of complications from COVID-19.

Case

Nissan Motors considered Nissan Computer's use of the name to be trademark dilution, and laid claim to the domain by alleging cyber squatting. However, Nissan Computer was named after its owner, Uzi Nissan. Following the outcome of the case, Nissan Motors uses the name nissanusa.com for its U.S. website.

References

United States trademark case law
Nissan